Nikola Arsenović (1823 – July 18, 1887) is a Serb designer and illustrator of folk costume; being posthumously dubbed a "Yugoslav ethnographer". A tailor by profession, he started illustrating peasant clothing while traveling the lands after having left his family and shop due to unknown reasons. The Ethnographic Museum in Belgrade acquired most of his work, the rest having been bought by various painters.

Life
He was born in Retfala, near Osijek, in 1823, the area being part of the Kingdom of Slavonia of the Austrian Empire (now part of Croatia).

He finished primary school in Osijek, and then decided to become a tailor. As a youngster, he travelled to Pest and Vienna, to perfect the craft, and also further to Paris and in Germany. He was away for 7 years, then returned, settling in Vukovar, where he married and opened a large tailor shop with eight workers. Apart from peasant (or "national") clothing, he also tailored for military officers, clergy and citizens.

He died in Belgrade, on July 18, 1887. He was a Yugoslavist, and called himself a Yugoslav.

Work

References

Further reading

External links

People from the Principality of Serbia
People from the Kingdom of Serbia
19th-century Serbian people
Serbian illustrators
Folk costumes
Serbian watercolourists
People from Osijek
Serbs of Croatia
Serbian tailors
Habsburg Serbs
Austro-Hungarian Serbs
1823 births
1887 deaths